Mostafa Al-Moeilo (born January 18, 1988) is a Saudi football player who plays a goalkeeper. He played in the Pro League for Al-Ettifaq and Najran.

References

1988 births
Living people
Saudi Arabian footballers
Association football goalkeepers
Ettifaq FC players
Al-Taraji Club players
Najran SC players
Al-Adalah FC players
Al-Noor FC players
Saudi Second Division players
Saudi First Division League players
Saudi Professional League players
Saudi Arabian Shia Muslims